Nationality words link to articles with information on the nation's poetry or literature (for instance, Irish or France).

Events
January 14 – Egyptian poet Omar Hazek, who was released from prison in September 2015, is prevented from leaving Egypt to receive the 2016 Oxfam Novib/PEN Award for Freedom of Expression.
January 26 –  Egyptian poet Fatima Naoot is sentenced to three years in prison, found guilty of "contempt of religion." Naoot goes to prison immediately and must appeal from there.
American poets Hawona Sullivan Janzen and Clarence White participate in public art project Rondo Family Reunion in Saint Paul, Minnesota.

Anniversaries
 January 25 – the 125th birthday of Osip Mandelstam.
 March 5 – semicentenary of the death of Anna Akhmatova, Russian poet (Requiem)
 March 27 – 90th birthday of Frank O'Hara. (See July 25)
 April 24 – centenary of the start of the Easter Rising in Dublin, which inspired W. B. Yeats’s poem "Easter, 1916".
 May 21 – 90th birthday of Robert Creeley (d. 2005).
 June 7 – semicentenary of the death of Jean Arp, French sculptor, painter and poet, leader in Dadaism
 July 11 – semicentenary of the death of Delmore Schwartz, American poet, Bollingen Prize winner and short story writer ("In Dreams Begin Responsibilities")
 July 25 – semicentenary of the death of Frank O'Hara, American poet and key member of the New York School of poetry. (See March 27)
 August 29 – semicentenary of the death of Melvin Tolson, American poet Modernist poet, educator, columnist, and politician
 September 25 – semicentenary of the death of Mina Loy, British-born American artist, poet, Futurist and actor
 September 28 – semicentenary of the death of André Breton, French poet, essayist and theorist; the leading exponent of Surrealism in literature

Selection of works published in English

Australia

Canada
Gwen Benaway, Passage
Joe Denham, Regeneration Machine
Steven Heighton, The Waking Comes Late
Susan Holbrook, Throaty Wipes
Garry Thomas Morse, Prairie Harbour 
Rachel Rose, Marry & Burn
Gregory Scofield, Witness, I Am

Anthologies in Canada

India
 Sudeep Sen, Erotext, Penguin Books,

New Zealand

 Tusiata Avia, Fale Aiutu – Spirit House, Victoria University Press,

Poets in Best New Zealand Poems
These poets wrote the 25 poems selected for Best New Zealand Poems 2015 (guest editor was John Newton, published this year:

Morgan Bach
Serie Barford
Sarah Jane Barnett
David Beach
Hera Lindsay Bird

Wystan Curnow
John Dennison
Belinda Diepenheim
Murray Edmond
Joan Fleming

Bernadette Hall
Dinah Hawken
Alexandra Hollis
Brent Kininmont
Iain Lonie

Selina Tusitala Marsh
Frankie McMillan
Gregory O'Brien
Vincent O'Sullivan
Frances Samuel

kani te manukura
Steven Toussaint
Bryan Walpert
Alison Wong
Ashleigh Young

United Kingdom

England
Jay Bernard, The Red and Yellow Nothing
Emily Berry, Anne Carson and Sophie Collins, If I'm Scared We Can't Win (Penguin Modern Poets)
Brian Bilston, You Took the Last Bus Home
Rachael Boast, Void Studies
Vahni Capildeo, Measures of Expatriation (Trinidad-born poet)
Melissa Lee-Houghton, Sunshine
Hollie McNish, Nobody Told Me
Alice Oswald, Falling Awake
Ruth Padel, Tidings – A Christmas Journey
Denise Riley, Say Something Back
Kae Tempest, Let Them Eat Chaos
Rebecca Watts, The Met Office Advises Caution

Northern Ireland

Scotland
Michel Faber, Undying: a love story (Dutch-born writer)

Anthologies in the United Kingdom
 Carol Ann Duffy and Gillian Clarke, The Map and the Clock: A Laureates' Choice of the Poetry of Britain and Ireland

Criticism, scholarship and biography in the United Kingdom

United States
Alphabetical listing by author name

 Jos Charles, Safe Space (Ahsahta Press)
 Matthew and Michael Dickman, Brother (Faber)
 Tyehimba Jess, Olio
 Ben Lerner, No Art (collection incorporating three previous volumes)
 Amanda Lovelace, The Princess Saves Herself in This One
 Michael Palmer, The Laughter of the Sphinx (New Directions)
 Ocean Vuong, Night Sky With Exit Wounds (Copper Canyon Press)
 C. D. Wright. ShallCross (Copper Canyon Press)

Anthologies in the United States

Criticism, scholarship and biography in the United States
J.D. McClatchy. Sweet Theft: A Poet's Commonplace Book
C. D. Wright. The Poet, The Lion, Talking Pictures, El Farolito, A Wedding in St. Roch, The Big Box Store, The Warp in the Mirror, Spring, Midnights, Fire & All (Copper Canyon Press)

Poets in The Best American Poetry 2016

Works published in other languages

French

German
 Antony Theodore, Du bist die Seele meins Seins (Ventura Verlag),

Awards and honors by country

Awards announced this year:

International
 Struga Poetry Evenings Golden Wreath Laureate : Margaret Atwood

Australia awards and honors
 C. J. Dennis Prize for Poetry:
 Kenneth Slessor Prize for Poetry:

Canada awards and honors
 Archibald Lampman Award: Pearl Pirie, the pet radish, shrunken
 Atlantic Poetry Prize: Susan Goyette, The Brief Reincarnation of a Girl
 2016 Governor General's Awards: Steven Heighton, The Waking Comes Late (English); Normand de Bellefeuille, Le poème est une maison de bord de mer (French)
 Griffin Poetry Prize:
Canada: Liz Howard, Infinite Citizen of the Shaking Tent
International: Norman Dubie, The Quotations of Bone
Lifetime Recognition Award (presented by the Griffin trustees): Adam Zagajewski.
 Latner Writers' Trust Poetry Prize: Gregory Scofield
 Gerald Lampert Award: Ben Ladouceur, Otter
 Pat Lowther Award: Lorna Crozier, The Wrong Cat
 Prix Alain-Grandbois: Rosalie Lessard, L'observatoire
 Raymond Souster Award: Lorna Crozier, The Wrong Cat
 Dorothy Livesay Poetry Prize: Raoul Fernandes, Transmitter and Receiver
 Prix Émile-Nelligan: Jonathan Lamy, La vie sauve

France awards and honors
Prix Goncourt de la Poésie:

India awards and honors
Sahitya Akademi Award : Papineni Sivasankar for Rajanigandha (Telugu)
Jnanpith Award : Shankha Ghosh

New Zealand awards and honors
 Prime Minister's Awards for Literary Achievement:
 Montana New Zealand Book Awards (poetry category):

United Kingdom awards and honors
 Cholmondeley Award: Maura Dooley, David Morley, Peter Sansom, Iain Sinclair
 Costa Award (formerly "Whitbread Awards") for poetry:
 Shortlist: Melissa Lee-Houghton, Sunshine; Alice Oswald, Falling Awake; Denise Riley, Say Something Back; Kae Tempest, Let Them Eat Chaos
 English Association's Fellows' Poetry Prizes:
 Eric Gregory Award (for a collection of poems by a poet under the age of 30):
 Forward Poetry Prize:
Best Collection: 
Shortlist: Vahni Capildeo, Measures of Expatriation
Best First Collection:
Shortlist: Tiphanie Yanique, Wife
Best Poem:
Shortlist:
 Jerwood Aldeburgh First Collection Prize for poetry:
Shortlist:
 Manchester Poetry Prize:
 National Poet of Wales:
 National Poetry Competition : Stephen Sexton for The Curfew 
 T. S. Eliot Prize (United Kingdom and Ireland): Jacob Polley, Jackself
Shortlist (announced in November 2016): 2016 Short List
 The Times / Stephen Spender Prize for Poetry Translation:
 Wilfred Owen Poetry Award: Carol Ann Duffy

United States awards and honors
 Arab American Book Award (The George Ellenbogen Poetry Award):
Honorable Mentions: 
 Agnes Lynch Starrett Poetry Prize: Erin Adair-Hodges for Let's All Die Happy
 Anisfield-Wolf Book Award: 
 Best Translated Book Award (BTBA):
 Beatrice Hawley Award from Alice James Books:
 Jackson Poetry Prize: Will Alexander (poet)
Judges: Elizabeth Alexander, Rae Armantrout, and Terrance Hayes 
 Lambda Literary Award:
 Gay Poetry: 
 Lesbian Poetry: 
 Lenore Marshall Poetry Prize:
 Los Angeles Times Book Prize: 
Finalists: 
 National Book Award for Poetry (NBA):
NBA Finalists:
NBA Longlist: 
NBA Judges: 
 National Book Critics Circle Award for Poetry: 
 The New Criterion Poetry Prize: 
 Pulitzer Prize for Poetry (United States): to Ozone Journal by Peter Balakian
Finalists: to Four-Legged Girl by Diane Seuss ; and to Alive: New and Selected Poems by Elizabeth Willis
 Wallace Stevens Award: 
 Whiting Awards: 
 PEN Award for Poetry in Translation: 
 PEN Center USA 2016 Poetry Award: 
 PEN/Voelcker Award for Poetry:                     
 Raiziss/de Palchi Translation Award:
 Ruth Lilly Poetry Prize: 
 Kingsley Tufts Poetry Award: 
 Walt Whitman Prize –         – Judge: 
 Yale Younger Series:

From the Poetry Society of America
 Frost Medal: 
 Shelley Memorial Award: 
 Writer Magazine/Emily Dickinson Award:
 Lyric Poetry Award:
 Alice Fay Di Castagnola Award:
 Louise Louis/Emily F. Bourne Student Poetry Award: 
 George Bogin Memorial Award: 
 Robert H. Winner Memorial Award: 
 Cecil Hemley Memorial Award:
 Norma Farber First Book Award:
 Lucille Medwick Memorial Award: 
 William Carlos Williams Award:        
Finalists for WCW Award:

Conferences and workshops by country

Australia

Canada

Mexico

New Zealand

United Kingdom

United States

Deaths

January – June
Birth years link to the corresponding "[year] in poetry" article:
 January 1 – Fazu Aliyeva, 83 (born 1932), Russian Avar poet and journalist
 January 6 – Nivaria Tejera, 86 (born 1929), Cuban poet and novelist
 January 9 – Zelimkhan Yaqub, 66 (born 1950), Azerbaijani poet
 January 12 – C. D. Wright, 67 (born 1949), American poet who was the former poet laureate of Rhode Island and winner of the 2009 International Griffin Poetry Prize
 January 15 – Francisco X. Alarcón, 61 (born 1954), Chicano-American poet who was born in California and grew up in Guadalajara, Mexico
 January 19 – Laurence Lerner, 90 (born 1925), South African-born English-language poet and academic
 February 7 – Andrew Glaze, 90 (born 1920), American poet appointed 11th Poet Laureate of Alabama in 2013
 February 8 – Nida Fazli, 77 (born 1938), Indian poet and lyricist
 February 21 – Akbar Ali, 90 (born 1925), Indian Kannada poet
Miroslav Nemirov, 54 (born 1961), Russian poet
 March 5 – Rafael Squirru, 90 (born 1925), Argentine author, art critic and poet
 April 13 – Jock Scot, 63 (born 1952), Scottish performance poet
 April 30 – Daniel Berrigan, 94 (born 1921), American Jesuit priest, poet, peace activist and recidivist (one of Catonsville Nine); winner of Lamont Prize for his book of poems Time Without Number
 June 4 – , 82, Russian poet.
 June 16 – Bill Berkson, 76, American poet and art critic, heart attack.
 June 25 – Adam Small, 79, South African writer and poet, winner of the Hertzog Prize. (born 1936). 
 June 30 – Sir Geoffrey Hill, 84, English poet

July – December
 July 1 – Yves Bonnefoy, 93, French poet, essayist, translator, and critic (born 1923)
September 3 – Peter Oresick, 60, American poet (born 1955)
September 4 – Novella Matveyeva, 81, Russian poet and singer-songwriter (born 1934)
 October 14 – Brigit Pegeen Kelly, American poet (born 1951)
October 28 – Jolanda Insana, 79, Italian poet and translator, Viareggio Prize recipient
December 27 – Anthony Cronin, 92, Irish poet (born 1928)
December 30 – Judith Ortiz Cofer, 64, Puerto Rican American poet and educator
December 31 – David Meltzer, 79, American poet and musician

See also

 Poetry
 List of years in poetry
 List of poetry awards

References

External links

2010s in poetry
2016 poems